ISPR may refer to:

 International Standard Payload Rack, a standard for hardware deployment in the International Space Station
 Institute of Socio-Political Research, a Russian academic research center
 Inter-Services Public Relations, the media wing of the Pakistan Armed Forces
 Inter-Services Public Relations (Bangladesh), the media wing of the Bangladesh Armed Forces